Antonio Signorini may refer to:
 Antonio Signorini (physicist)
 Antonio Signorini (artist)